Cinnamon Toast Crunch (CTC), known as Croque-Cannelle in French Canada and Curiously Cinnamon in the UK (previously Cinnamon Grahams), and as a variant called Cini Minis in other European and Latin American countries, is a brand of breakfast cereal produced by General Mills and Nestlé. First produced in 1984, the cereal aims to provide the taste of cinnamon toast in a crunch cereal format. The cereal consists of small squares or rectangles of wheat and rice covered with cinnamon and sugar. The cereal is puffed and when immersed in milk, it makes a "snap" noise, similar to Rice Krispies. In most European countries and North America, the product is sold in boxes. In Poland and Russia the cereal is sold in bags. The product was originally marketed outside Europe with the mascot of a jolly baker named Wendell. Wendell was replaced as a mascot by the "Crazy Squares", sentient Cinnamon Toast Crunch squares that often eat each other in commercials.

History
Originally the cereal was plain squares but currently features cinnamon-colored swirling on each piece. It was invented by scientist John Mendesh and General Mills assistant product manager Elisabeth Trach after receiving the idea from an unnamed child in a "give us your best idea for a cereal" radio contest held by General Mills. The child received a set of Hot Wheels toys as a grand prize. Starting in 1985 there were three animated bakers as the mascots, one of which is named Wendell. The other two bakers, known as Bob and Quello, were considerably more youthful in appearance than Wendell. In 1991, the younger bakers were dropped, leaving Wendell as the sole mascot for several years.

United Kingdom
The product was first introduced to the United Kingdom and Ireland in 1998 by Cereal Partners, as Cinnamon Toast Crunch, the same name as the popular North American cereal brand. The name was later changed to Cinnamon Grahams, similar to Golden Grahams, another Nestlé product. The name was once again changed to its current name of Curiously Cinnamon, produced by Cereal Partners under the Nestlé brand.

Description

Cinnamon Toast Crunch consists of whole grain wheat and rice squares about 1.37cm in size, which are then coated with a blend of cinnamon and sugar, and fortified with various vitamins and minerals.

One serving of Cinnamon Toast Crunch cereal, equal to ¾ cup (177 mL) or 31 g, has 130 calories (544 kJ), or 170 calories (711 kJ) with ½ cup (118 mL) of skim milk.  A single serving has 3 g of total fat, no cholesterol, 220 mg of sodium, and 45 mg of potassium.  One serving has 25 g of total carbohydrates with 2 g of dietary fiber and 9 g of sugars with 14 g of other carbohydrates. A single serving also contains 1 g of protein. Cinnamon Toast Crunch was reformulated in an industry-led sugar reduction effort in 2012. The original formulation contained 10 grams per 3/4 cup serving, while the 2012 reformulation (still current ) contains 9 grams sugar per 3/4 cup serving.

Marketing
Originally, the three bakers were the mascots and the cereal did not have a slogan. Starting in 1995, it was given the slogan, "The taste you can see."  In 2007, Cinnamon Toast Crunch experimented with a new slogan, "It's That Intense", but switched back after poor reception. In 2009, the slogan became "Crave those crazy squares".

In 1997, appealing to adult-oriented programming, a campaign featured the slogan "The adult thing to do", mostly centering on "adult" things reverting to children's, including cereal (for instance, a fictional "adult" cereal named "Health Pellets" is replaced with Cinnamon Toast Crunch). This was changed in 2004 to "Breakfast on a whole other level", which was replaced with "Crave those crazy squares" in 2009.

Spin-offs
There have been at least five offshoots of the cereal:
 Chocolate Toast Crunch
 French Toast Crunch in 1995 and again in 2015
 Peanut Butter Toast Crunch in 2004 and 2013
 Frosted Toast Crunch in 2012
 Sugar Cookie Toast Crunch for the 2014 holiday season, 2015, 2018
 Dulce de Leche Toast Crunch, 2021
 Apple Pie Toast Crunch, 2021
 Lucky Charms Cinnamon Toast Crunch Mix, 2022

French Toast Crunch is shaped like many little French toast slices, reminiscent of the style of Cookie Crisp.  It was discontinued in 2006, but made a return in 2015 due to its cult popularity among its fans. Peanut Butter Toast Crunch was a cereal consisting of flakes similar but darker to Cinnamon Toast Crunch. Frosted Toast Crunch resembles Cinnamon Toast Crunch with vanilla coating. This cereal was discontinued by 2006. As another offshoot, Monopoly Cereal was a limited edition product created in April 2003 by General Mills. The cereal was like Cinnamon Toast Crunch but with the addition of marshmallows based on the pieces in the Monopoly game, such as houses and hotels. Sugar Cookie Toast Crunch was like Cinnamon Toast Crunch except with a sugar cookie taste.

In Germany, Austria, Romania, Hungary, Israel, and Poland where a variant of the cereal is known as Cini Minis, a strawberry flavoured variant named Erdbeer Minis/Strawberry Minis exists.  In Germany and Austria it replaced a previously existing apple flavoured variant called Äpple Minis.  This strawberry flavoured variant was later released in the UK as Curiously Strawberry.

In 2018, Cinnamon Toast Crunch Churros were introduced. The cereal has the same cinnamon sugar flavor as the original but is shaped like a mini churro.

Shrimp tail contamination incident
On March 22, 2021, American writer, rapper and podcaster Jensen Karp found what appeared to be discarded shrimp tails in his Cinnamon Toast Crunch cereal; his tweets about the incident went viral. Additionally, Karp found a piece of string, "small black pieces" embedded into some pieces of the cereal, and an object which looked like a pea. General Mills then issued a statement on Twitter claiming the tails were "an accumulation of the cinnamon sugar that sometimes can occur when ingredients aren't thoroughly blended". , General Mills claim they are investigating the case, but that contamination "did not occur at [their] facility".

The incident was covered internationally by multiple major news outlets, who were critical of the company's response.

See also
 List of breakfast cereals
 Fitness (cereal)

References

Further reading

External links

 

General Mills cereals
Nestlé cereals
1984 establishments in the United States
Products introduced in 1984